Hotal Deshan is a village of Battagram District in Khyber-Pakhtunkhwa province of Pakistan. It is part of Peshora Union Council and lies within Deshan Aera.

See also
 Battagram District
 Battagram Tehsil
 Deshan
 Khyber-Pakhtunkhwa

Populated places in Khyber Pakhtunkhwa
Battagram District